The Other Economic Summit (TOES) was a counter-summit to the annual G7 summits, first held in 1984 in London.  It included diverse groups of economists, greens and community activists.  TOES eventually became an umbrella term and similar meetings were organised around the world for the next two decades.

TOES summits 
The Other Economic Summit (TOES) was the idea of Sally Willington (1931-2008), founder of AIMS and founder member of the British Green Party. The First TOES in 1984 was organised by  the New Economics Foundation and the Right Livelihood Awards, and was focused on alternative development and environmental issues.
 The New Economics Foundation, a UK-based think tank, had the aim of working towards a "new model of wealth creation, based on equality, diversity and economic stability".

The purpose of the summit was to highlight that the economy could be organised in other ways. TOES also challenged the right of the G7 leaders to speak for the world. TOES demanded that the system of global economic governance should be democratised. It was also suggested that the G7 Summits should be replaced by a representative World Economic Council within the United Nations system. 

From 1985 to 1987 TOES was held in the UK, sending a delegation to the G-7 summit city. From 1988 onward, TOES convened every year in the city of the G-7 Summit. In 1988 TOES North America sponsored the TOES in Toronto which was part of a Citizens Summit. In 1989 TOES France held an alternative summit in Paris entitled "L'Autre Sommet Economique". The 1990 TOES was held for three days in Houston, Texas  
 The 1991 TOES was organized by the New Economics Foundation, which organised TOES again in 1998 as part of a "Peoples' Summit" in Birmingham.

Political scientist Andrew Vincent argues that an ecologically based theory of economics underpins TOES, part of an emerging political ideology referred to by Vincent as ecologism.

Founding
British environmentalist Jonathon Porritt, economists Paul Ekins (initial director of TOES), David Fleming and James Robertson, Alison Pritchard, a Schumacher Society Council member, Jakob von Uexkull, founder of the Right Livelihood Award, and others helped to set up TOES and the New Economics Foundation.

References

Political conferences
Recurring events established in 1984